Leucolepis is a genus of mosses in the family Mniaceae.

Species
 Leucolepis acanthoneura
 Leucolepis menziesii

References

Moss genera
Mniaceae